General Carr may refer to:

Eugene Asa Carr (1830–1910), Union Army brigadier general and brevet major general
Irving J. Carr (1875–1963), U.S. Army major general
John Carr (Indiana politician) (1793–1845), Indiana Militia major general
Joseph Bradford Carr (1828–1895), Union Army brevet major general
Julian Carr (industrialist) (1845–1924), North Carolina industrialist and Ku Klux Klan supporter nicknamed "General Carr"
Laurence Carr (1886–1954), British Army lieutenant general
Richard Carr (chaplain) (1925–2002), U.S. Air Force major general
William Keir Carr (1923–2020), Canadian Air Force lieutenant general

See also
Attorney General Carr (disambiguation)